Alt Pirineu i Aran (in Catalan Vegueria de l'Alt Pirineu i Aran) is one of the seven vegueries (territories) defined by the Regional Plan of Catalonia. It is located in the Catalan High Pyrenees (in Catalan Alt Pirineu).

It is formed by six comarques (roughly equivalent to a county): Alt Urgell, Alta Ribagorça, Baixa Cerdanya, Pallars Jussà, Pallars Sobirà and Val d'Aran. Val d'Aran has an autonomous government called Conselh Generau d'Aran.

The veguerie of Alt Pirineu i Aran is the largest territory, with 18% of Catalonia's total surface area, but the one with the least  population (69,335 inhabitants), with a density of 12.2 inhabitants/km2 (31.5/mi2).

Veguerie

The Veguerie (Vegueria in Catalan) was an important feudal land division in the Principality of Catalonia,  the Kingdom of Sardinia, and the Duchy of Athens during the Middle Ages until the Nueva Planta decrees of 1716. It was the primary division of a county in Catalonia and the basic territorial unit of government in Sardinia and Athens after those countries became part of the Crown of Aragon. The office of a veguer was called a vigeriate (Latin: vigeriatus).

In 1936, Catalonia was reconstituted into comarques. Although these were quickly abolished in 1939 they were reconstituted again in 1987. Each comarca was grouped with two to four others into a veguerie, of which there were nine, with their capitals at Barcelona, Girona, Tremp, Vic, Manresa, Lleida, Reus, Tarragona, and Tortosa.

Since the 1987 reconstitution it has been decided that Vegueries will be formally re-established in 2011. Under the 2006 Statute of Autonomy of Catalonia, the four provinces which make up Catalonia are due to be replaced by seven vegueries, which will also take over many of the functions of the comarques. As of October 2008, the final boundaries of the new vegueries have yet to be formally approved, they are expected to incorporate largely historical boundaries: Àmbit metropolità de Barcelona, Alt Pirineu i Aran, Camp de Tarragona, Comarques Centrals, Comarques Gironines, Ponent or Lleida, Terres de l'Ebre.

References

Geography of Catalonia
Functional territorial sections of Catalonia